The Men's 3 m synchro springboard at the 2010 Commonwealth Games was held on 12 October 2010.

Results

References
 Reports

Aquatics at the 2010 Commonwealth Games